Lover of the Monster is a 1974 gothic horror film directed by Sergio Garrone and starring Klaus Kinski.

Plot
Dr. Alex Nijinski (Klaus Kinski) stumbles upon a secret experimental laboratory when he returns to his wife's ancestral homestead.  Work in the lab turns the curious doctor into a Jekyll and Hyde split personality, with the evil alter ago going on a killing rampage in the town which is blamed on a pair of tramps.

Cast

Although credited, Carla Mancini, Alessandro Perrella and Stella Calderoni to not appear in the film. Ayhan Işık, Erol Taş and Roberto Messina are not credited in the Italian prints of the film.

Production
After directing the war film La colomba non deve volare, director Sergio Garrone began work on a horror film. After contacting the Italian distributor named Sabatini, he was introduced to the Rome-based Turkish producer Şakir V. Sözen. Sözen had previously produced Farouk Agrama's crime film L'amico del padrino offered the location of a huge villa and proposed casting the Turkish actor Ayhan Işık who had co-starred in Lamico del padrino. According to Garrone, Sözen suggested instead of making one film in six weeks, that they should make two films in eight weeks. This led to the production of both le amanti del mostro and The Hand That Feeds the Dead.

Le amanti del mostro was filmed in Istanbul and at Elios Studios in Rome.

Release
Le amanti del mostro was released theatrically in Italy on 28 May 1974 where it was distributed by Morini.

Footnotes

References

External links

1974 films
Italian horror films
Turkish horror films
1974 horror films
Films shot in Istanbul
Gothic horror films
Films shot in Rome
1970s Italian films